La Valentina may refer to:

"La Valentina" (corrido), revolutionary ballad 
La Valentina (1938 film), starring Jorge Negrete and Esperanza Baur
La Valentina (1966 film), starring María Félix and Eulalio González
Pancho Villa y la Valentina (1960 film), starring Pedro Armendáriz and Elsa Aguirre